This is a list of radio stations in the state of Chihuahua, in Amplitude Modulation and Frequency Modulation bands.

Chihuahua 

Amplitude Modulation

Frequency Modulation

NA: Not available

Ciudad Camargo 

Frequency Modulation

Ciudad Cuauhtémoc 

Amplitude Modulation

Frequency Modulation

Ciudad Delicias 

Frequency Modulation

Ciudad Jiménez 

Frequency Modulation

Ciudad Juárez 

Amplitude Modulation

NA: Not available

Frequency Modulation

NA: Not available

Ciudad Madera 

Amplitude Modulation

Frequency Modulation

Guachochi 

Amplitude Modulation

Frequency Modulation

Hidalgo del Parral 

Amplitude Modulation

Frequency Modulation

Nuevo Casas Grandes 

Amplitude Modulation

Frequency Modulation

Ojinaga 

Frequency Modulation

San Buenaventura 

Frequency Modulation

Closing stations 
All the AM stations that appear here requested their change of frequency to broadcast on FM.

Chihuahua 

Amplitude Modulation

Ciudad Camargo 

Amplitude Modulation

Ciudad Cuauhtémoc 

Amplitude Modulation

Ciudad Delicias 

Amplitude Modulation

Hidalgo del Parral 

Amplitude Modulation

Frequency Modulation

Ojinaga 

Amplitude Modulation

Previous formats

Chihuahua 

Frequency Modulation

Combo

Ciudad Cuauhtémoc 

Frequency Modulation

Ciudad Juárez 

Amplitude Modulation

Frequency Modulation

Hidalgo del Parral 

Amplitude Modulation

Frequency Modulation

Nuevo Casas Grandes 

Frequency Modulation

Ojinaga, Chih. 

Frequency Modulation

Frequency changes

Chihuahua 

Amplitude Modulation

Ciudad Juárez 

Amplitude Modulation

Ciudad Cuauhtémoc 

Amplitude Modulation

Hidalgo del Parral 

Amplitude Modulation

Notes 

 All the amplitude modulated radio stations in Chihuahua that acquired an FM frequency means that they are going to change their frequency, except for the XEDI-AM and XEFA-AM stations, because their FM frequency is additional.

References

External links 
 http://www.ift.org.mx/iftweb/wp-content/uploads/2015/01/Infraestructura_FM_20-01-15.pdf
 http://www.ift.org.mx/iftweb/wp-content/uploads/2015/01/Infraestructura_AM_20-01-15.pdf

Chihuahua